United Nations Security Council Resolution 257, adopted unanimously on September 11, 1968, after examining the application of Swaziland for membership in the United Nations, the Council recommended to the General Assembly that Swaziland be admitted.

See also
List of United Nations Security Council Resolutions 201 to 300 (1965–1971)

References
Text of the Resolution at undocs.org

External links
 

 0257
Foreign relations of Eswatini
 0257
1968 in Swaziland
 0257
September 1968 events